Several ships have born the name Amelia:

  was Admiral Maarten Tromp's flagship during part of the Eighty Years' War. 
  was a ship launched in 1787 in France that the British captured. Under her British owners she made one voyage as a whaler and one voyage as a slave ship. She is last listed in 1806.
  was a ship built in Demaun that the French Navy captured in 1796 as Amelia was carrying rice to Britain.
  was built in Massachusetts in 1809 probably under another name. The British captured her in 1813 and she was a British merchantman until she foundered in 1829.
  was a ship that disappeared in 1816 after leaving Sydney for China.
  was a passenger ship built in 1900, and Royal yacht for the Portuguese monarch until 1910.

See also
  was built in France under another name and captured by the British in 1809. Her new owners renamed her and she became a West Indiaman. She later became a whaler and was wrecked in 1833 on her fifth whaling voyage.
  - any one of four ships of the Royal Navy, with a fifth planned
  – any one of four vessels 

Ship names